Octopath Traveler II is a role-playing video game developed by Square Enix and Acquire and published by Square Enix. It is a sequel to Octopath Traveler (2018), and the third entry in the series after the prequel mobile game Octopath Traveler: Champions of the Continent (2020), though it features a new cast of characters and setting separate from prior games. It was released worldwide on February 24, 2023 for Nintendo Switch, PlayStation 4, PlayStation 5 and Windows; it is the first Octopath game released on PlayStation platforms.

Gameplay
Similar to the first Octopath Traveler, the game plays as a traditional JRPG. The player moves between eight separate characters, each with their own purpose for traversing the game world. Once again, each character has their own "path action" - a particular means for the player to have the respective character interact with non-player characters in the game world, often with the goal of getting reward items or characters to fight in support of their cause. New to the sequel is there being distinct "daytime" and nighttime" segments of gameplay, with path actions being different depending on the time of day. For example, the player can choose to make the character Hikari duel characters in the daytime, in hopes of learning new skills for battle, but at night, there is the separate option to instead spend in-game currency to bribe characters for information or items.

The game retains the turn-based battle system of the first game as well, including the "break" and "boost" systems. Every enemy has a number of hidden "weakness" attributes related to being weak to particular weapons or elements. Once discovered, an indicator is shown onscreen, and if it is exploited enough times, a "break" occurs, temporarily weakening the enemy. Every turn, "boost points" are accumulated, which can be used for extra moves in future turns. New to the battle system are "Latent Powers", which function similar to limit breaks in Final Fantasy, moves that can only be accessed once a gauge builds up over the course of a battle.

Story
While Octopath Traveler II retains the same structure of following eight separate character's stories throughout the game, it follows eight new characters in a new setting separate from the prior games. It takes place in the world of Solistia, a setting that is more modern than the prior game's medieval setting, which is presented more like something from the nineteenth or twentieth centuries. The game's main cast includes Agnea Bristarni, a dancer; Partitio Yellowil, a merchant;  Hikari Ku, a warrior; Osvald V. Vanstein, a scholar; Throné Anguis, a thief; Temenos Mistral, a cleric; Castti Florenz, an apothecary; and Ochette, a hunter. A character's occupation generally ties in to the character overarching goal; the dancer Agnea is on a quest to become a world famous entertainer, and the merchant Partitio is on a quest to make money and end poverty.  Hikari's story follows his quest to return home after being haunted by previous battles, Osvald is on a quest for revenge on a man who ruined his life, Throné is on a quest for freedom, Castti and Temenos are on separate journeys related to personal discovery and truth, and Ochette is searching for creatures of legend. The characters' stories intertwine more than in the prior game.

Development
The game was first announced during a Nintendo Direct broadcast on September 13, 2022, with first live gameplay footage being shown a few days later at the Tokyo Game Show. Like the prior 2 entries in the series, Octopath Traveler and Octopath Traveler: Champions of the Continent, the game uses a graphical style dubbed as "HD-2D" - an approach that recreates the 2D pixel-based graphics style of the 16-bit era of video games, and portrays it in a high-definition, 3D diorama style. At the time of announcement, the game was already estimated to be approximately 90% complete. The game was released on February 24, 2023, for the Nintendo Switch, PlayStation 4, PlayStation 5, and Windows platforms. A limited edition of the game with figurines of all eight main characters and an art book will also be offered. There is a playable demo of the game available on Nintendo Switch, Playstation and Steam prior to release.

Reception

Critical reception

Octopath Traveler II received "generally favorable" reviews, according to review aggregator Metacritic.

While enjoying the visuals, Polygon criticized the narrative of the main party, "When fighting, considering their strengths and weaknesses and using their abilities in concert during turn-based battles is crucial. But come to a main story scene, and everyone but the single person directly involved will suddenly disappear."

Others were more positive, with RPGFan asserting that the game improves on its predecessor, "Octopath Traveler II takes everything good about the first game, turns it up to 11, adds a few quality-of-life updates, and is, in fact, the superior game overall."

Sales

The Nintendo Switch version of Octopath Traveler II was the second bestselling retail game during its first week of release in Japan, with 53,995 physical copies being sold across the country. The PlayStation 5 version was the eighth bestselling retail game in Japan throughout the same week, with 14,422 physical copies being sold, while the PlayStation 4 version sold 7,269 physical copies in the country, making it the eleventh bestselling retail game of the week in the country.

See also
 Triangle Strategy - a game by Square Enix featuring the same graphical HD-2D style and also produced by Team Asano.

References

External links

2023 video games
Acquire (company) games
Fantasy video games
Japanese role-playing video games
Nintendo Switch games
PlayStation 4 games
PlayStation 5 games
Single-player video games
Square Enix games
Video games developed in Japan
Video games scored by Yasunori Nishiki
Unreal Engine games
Windows games